Kyriakos Andreopoulos (born 18 January 1994) is a Greek professional footballer who plays as a defensive midfielder for German NOFV-Oberliga Süd club VFC Plauen.

Club career
Born in Athens, Andreopoulos began his career with Panathinaikos youth team, but moved to Kalamata after being deemed surplus to requirements. He did not make one appearance for Kalamata in the league but did manage a cup appearance. 

Shortly afterwards he was transferred to Kerkyra for a fee believed to be in the region of €100,000. At the time Kerkyra were in the top tier of Greek football, the Superleague Greece. Andreopoulos made one appearance for the club that season in which Kerkyra were relegated to the Football League, Greece's 2nd tier of football. Andreopoulos proved vital in Kerkyra's push for promotion notching up 23 appearances in the league, 2 in the cup where they were knocked out by Panetolikos, and 9 in the promotion playoff in which evidently Kerkyra finished 2nd in meaning they returned to Greece's top flight. In the 2014-15 season Andreopoulos managed 26 appearances scoring one goal. 

His appearances caught the eye of AEK Athens who having just been promoted back to the Superleague Greece for the 2015-16 season, acquired Andreopoulos for a fee believed to be in the region of €160,000. On 2 July 2015, he signed with a three year contract with AEK Athens. 

On 26 August 2016, after an unsuccessful passage from AEK Athens he signed a two year contract with Kerkyra. 

On 27 July 2017, he signed a three year contract with AEL for an undisclosed fee.

International career
Andreopoulos played for the Greece U17s, making his debut in 2010. Two years later he made his debut for the Greece U19s, and on 30 March 2015 his debut for the Greece U21s.

References

External links
 Kerkyra official website profile (Greek)

1994 births
Footballers from Athens
Living people
Greek footballers
Greece youth international footballers
Greece under-21 international footballers
Association football midfielders
Kalamata F.C. players
PAE Kerkyra players
AEK Athens F.C. players
Athlitiki Enosi Larissa F.C. players
Trikala F.C. players
ZFC Meuselwitz players
VFC Plauen players
Super League Greece players
Football League (Greece) players
Regionalliga players
Oberliga (football) players
Greek expatriate footballers
Expatriate footballers in Germany
Greek expatriate sportspeople in Germany